Azelnidipine (INN; marketed under the brand name CalBlock — カルブロック) is a dihydropyridine calcium channel blocker. Azelnidipine is L and T calcium channel blocker. 
It is sold in Japan by Daiichi-Sankyo pharmaceuticals, Inc.
Unlike nicardipine, it has a gradual onset and has a long-lasting antihypertensive effect, with little increase in heart rate. Drug Controller General Of India (DCGI) has approved the use of azelnipine in India. It is launched under the brand name Azusa (ajanta pharma ltd.) In 2020.

References

Aldosterone synthase inhibitors
Calcium channel blockers
Dihydropyridines
Carboxylate esters
Azetidines
Nitrobenzenes
Isopropyl esters